Manuel Costas Sanromán (8 May 1942 – 15 December 2020) was a Spanish professional footballer who played as a defender.

Career
Born in Panxón, Costas played for Sevilla, Recreativo de Huelva and Linares.

He died on 15 December 2020, aged 78.

References

1942 births
2020 deaths
Spanish footballers
Sevilla FC players
Recreativo de Huelva players
Linares CF players
La Liga players
Segunda División players
Association football defenders
People from Vigo (comarca)
Sportspeople from the Province of Pontevedra